Beaufort Castle can refer to several places:

 Beaufort Castle, Florennes, Belgium
 Beaufort Castle, France, in the historical region of Auvergne
 Beaufort Castle in Huy, Belgium
 Beaufort Castle, Lebanon
 Beaufort Castle, Luxembourg
 Beaufort Castle, Scotland, near Beauly

See also 
Beaufort (disambiguation)